The 1987 European Super Cup was played between Porto and Ajax, with Porto winning 2–0.

Match details

First leg

Second leg

See also
1986–87 European Cup
1986–87 European Cup Winners' Cup
AFC Ajax in international football competitions
FC Porto in international football competitions

References

External links
Summary from UEFA
 Summary from RSSSF

Super Cup
1987
Super Cup 1987
Super Cup 1987
Super Cup 1987
Super Cup 1987
Super Cup 1987
Super Cup 1987
November 1987 sports events in Europe
Super Cup
1980s in Amsterdam
European Super Cup, 1987
Sports competitions in Porto
20th century in Porto